Atelopus pictiventris is a species of toad in the family Bufonidae. It is endemic to Colombia. Its natural habitats are subtropical or tropical moist montane forests, rivers, pastureland, and heavily degraded former forest.

References

Sources

pictiventris
Amphibians of Colombia
Amphibians of the Andes
Amphibians described in 1986
Taxonomy articles created by Polbot